William Fitzgerald Crawford (29 April 1844 – 15 December 1915) was a New Zealand storekeeper, brewer, photographer, writer and served as the first mayor of Gisborne, elected in 1877. He was born in Fortfield, County Tipperary, Ireland on 29 April 1844. During the 1890s and early 1900s Crawford wrote for the Poverty Bay Herald under the pen-name Trix.

References

1844 births
1915 deaths
Mayors of Gisborne, New Zealand
New Zealand photographers
Irish emigrants to New Zealand (before 1923)
People from County Tipperary